Ignacio Rodes (born  24 August 1961 in Alicante, Spain) is a Spanish Classical guitarist.

Biography
Ignacio Rodes started the guitar studies with his mother when he was 8, then went to the Conservatory of Alicante where he studied with José Tomás between 1983 and 1986. He got a scholarship to study in London. Ignacio Rodes is currently Professor of the Conservatory of Alicante and director in the Guitar Master of Guitar Performance the University of Alicante.

Career

Since his debut at the Wigmore Hall (London) in 1986, he has performed at international festivals in most of the European countries, USA and South America. He has played in very prestigious concert halls including Alte Oper (Frankfurt), Alice Tully Hall (New York), Performing Art’s Center (San Francisco), Great Philharmonic Hall (St, Petersburg), Chopin’s Museum (Warsaw), Palau de la Música (Barcelona), Auditorio Nacional (Madrid), Sala Nezahualcoyotl (México), Opera Theatre of Cairo... Rodes has broadcast on many European and American television and radio stations.

Orchestras

He has appeared as soloist with:

 English Chamber Orchestra
 Belgrade Philharmonic
 Hartford Symphony Orchestra
 Orchestre de Picardie
 Camerata Hermitage of Saint Petersburg
 Ho Chi Minh Symphony Orchestra
 Orquestra Simfònica de Barcelona
 Real Filharmonía de Galicia
 Orquesta Sinfónica de Madrid
 Orquesta Sinfónica de Tenerife

Awards

First Prize winner of five international competitions, including the prestigious ‘Andrés Segovia’, ‘Francisco Tárrega’ and ‘José Ramirez’.

Recordings
Discography includes five Cds published by Opera Tres, EMEC, Fundación de Música Contemporánea and EMI classics.

References
 Enciclopedia de la guitarra.
 Gramophone Magazine 
 Diario ABC. Ignacio Rodes winner of Andres Segovia competition. 1983

External links
 Personal webpage
 Classical Guitar Alicante
 http://www.elartedevivirelflamenco.com/guitarristas268.html

Classical guitarists
1961 births
Living people